Camilo Alfonso Ospina Bernal (born 23 December 1959) is a Colombian lawyer and politician. He served as Permanent Representative of Colombia to the Organization of American States and Minister of National Defence of Colombia in the Administration of President Álvaro Uribe Vélez.

References

1959 births
Living people
People from Bogotá
Camilo
Del Rosario University alumni
Academic staff of Del Rosario University
20th-century Colombian lawyers
Colombian Ministers of Defense
Permanent Representatives of Colombia to the Organization of American States